Ricardo Bianchini from Rutgers University and Microsoft Research, Bellevue, Wash., was named Fellow of the Institute of Electrical and Electronics Engineers (IEEE) in 2015 for contributions to server and data center energy management. He was named an Association for Computing Machinery (ACM) Fellow in 2016  for contributions to power, energy and thermal management of servers and datacenters.

References

External links
 

Fellow Members of the IEEE
Fellows of the Association for Computing Machinery
Living people
University of Rochester alumni
Microsoft employees
Microsoft Research people
Year of birth missing (living people)